WYAM-LD (channel 51, digital channel 28) is a community based independent low-powered Commercial digital television station licensed in Priceville, Alabama, owned by Decatur Communications Properties LLC.  The Studio and Business office is in Decatur, Alabama.

WYAM-LD Channel 51-1 is carried on Spectrum Communications Channel 20 and WOW cable systems in Morgan and Limestone Counties, Alabama. Off-air UHF coverage includes all of Morgan and Limestone Counties and major portions of Lawrence and Madison Counties, Alabama. Coverage population is over 530,000 according to the 2010 census data.

Programming is twenty-four hours per day and includes approximately eighty hours per week of locally produced programming such as Valley Happenings, Talk of the Town, Decatur City Council meetings, Morgan County Commission meetings, Best of Rick and Bubba, local High School sports and programs produced by community members and organisations in the WYAM-LD studio or independent studios covering a broad range of subjects of local interest.  Programming also includes family oriented shows from World Harvest Family and Cornerstone TeleVision Networks.  Network programming aired includes The Fishing Edge, Hometown, Today's Homeowner, Gardening with Paul Allen Smith, American Outdoorsman, At Home with Arlene, Gaither Homecoming Hour, the Health & Home Report,
The Harvest Show and the 700 Club. The station is also an affiliate of T.
H.I.S. TV network.  T.H.I.S. TV is a free premium channel that brings you award-winning films, box office hits, cult classics, retro TV series and all your favorite Hollywood stars! For a list of shows and other programs go to www.thistv.com

WYAM-LD Channel 51-2 use to broadcasts the Spanish language network Azteca America until its shutdown on New Years Day 2022-23. Channel 51-3 broadcasts a simulcast of sister Radio station WYAM Fiesta Mexicana 890 AM.

External links

Low-power television stations in the United States
YAM-LD